Skotniki  is a village in the administrative district of Gmina Aleksandrów, within Piotrków County, Łódź Voivodeship, in central Poland.

Skotniki lies on the Pilica River. It contains a church from the year 1528 and a manor house (16th century) with a park from the turn of the 16th and 17th centuries. Skotniki is a famous summer resort. The village is on the "Szlak wodny Pilicy" - a kayak route on the Pilica River. In the area are Diabla Góra Nature Reserve and a landscape park called Sulejów Landscape Park (Sulejowski Park Krajobrazowy).

References

External links
Skotniki
Skotniki

Villages in Piotrków County